Jeffrey Whitley (born 28 January 1979) is a former professional footballer who now works for the Professional Footballers Association as a player wellbeing executive.

As a player he was a midfielder who notably played in the Premier League for Manchester City and Sunderland. He also played in the Football League for Wrexham, Notts County, Cardiff City and Stoke City, as well as for non-league sides Woodley Sports, Northwich Victoria and Droylsden. Born in Zambia, he represented the Northern Ireland, earning 20 caps.

Club career
Whitley was a product of the Manchester City youth scheme which he joined as a ten-year-old and began his club career as a trainee in 1996, making over 120 league and cup appearances for the first-team. He had a two-month loan spell at Wrexham in the 1998–99 season. and in March 2002, having fallen out of favour at Manchester City, joined Notts County on loan for the remainder of the 2001–02 season. He had a three-month loan spell at Notts County in the 2002–03 season, returning to Manchester City in January 2003 but was released by the club in March 2003 as he did not feature in manager Kevin Keegan's plans.

After a trial and impressing in pre-season, he signed a contract with Sunderland in August 2003. He made over 70 league and cup appearances for Sunderland, helping the club to the Football League Championship play-offs at the end of the 2003–04 season and to the Football League Championship title in 2005. In July 2005, he joined Cardiff City on a free transfer and made 38 league and cup appearances for the club in the 2005–06 season, scoring once against Watford in the league. Whitley joined Stoke City on loan in August 2006 but made only four appearances in an unsuccessful loan spell. Cardiff made him available for transfer but he did not take up offers to talk with Millwall and Rotherham and joined Wrexham in February 2007 on loan for the remainder of the 2006–07 season. He scored the winning goal against Bristol Rovers in a 1–0 away victory in March 2007. He was released by Cardiff and signed for Wrexham on non-contract terms in January 2008 but was released by Wrexham in May 2008 following the club's relegation to the Football Conference. He joined Northern Premier League Division One North side Woodley Sports in an effort to gain match fitness, before signing for Northwich Victoria on 7 March 2009.

International career
Despite being Zambian born, due to Whitley living in England since he was a child, he was eligible to, and played for the England under-17 team. As his father was born in Belfast, he was also eligible to play for Northern Ireland and made his debut for them in 1997.

Personal life
His brother, Jim was also a professional footballer, with both brothers playing for Manchester City at the same time.

Whitley has spent time at the Sporting Chance clinic after becoming addicted to alcohol and drugs. It affected him greatly and said "at times I would just be praying just to die". Whitley previously worked as a car salesman in the Stockport area whilst training to become a qualified Counsellor. He now works for the Professional Footballers' Association.

Career statistics

Club
Source:

A.  The "Other" column constitutes appearances and goals in the Football League Trophy and Football League play-offs.

International
Source:

References

External links

IFA profile with photo and information

1979 births
Living people
People from Ndola
Association footballers from Northern Ireland
Northern Ireland international footballers
Northern Ireland under-21 international footballers
Zambian footballers
People from Northern Ireland of Zambian descent
Zambian people of Northern Ireland descent
Association football midfielders
Manchester City F.C. players
Wrexham A.F.C. players
Notts County F.C. players
Sunderland A.F.C. players
Cardiff City F.C. players
Stoke City F.C. players
Stockport Sports F.C. players
Northwich Victoria F.C. players
Zambian emigrants to the United Kingdom
Premier League players
English Football League players